The ceremonial county of Norfolk has returned nine MPs to the UK Parliament since 2010.

Number of seats 
The table below shows the number of MPs representing Norfolk at each major redistribution of seats affecting the county.

1Prior to 1950, seats were classified as County Divisions or Parliamentary Boroughs. Since 1950, they have been classified as County or Borough Constituencies.

Timeline

Boundary reviews

See also 

 List of parliamentary constituencies in Norfolk

References 

Parliamentary constituencies in Norfolk (historic)